Dawn O'Porter (born Dawn Porter; 23 January 1979) is a British writer, director, and television presenter.

Early life
Dawn O’Porter was born in Alexandria, Scotland, but raised in Guernsey. She studied acting at the Liverpool Institute for Performing Arts but in her third year decided that acting was not for her and did work experience on the television series Baddiel and Skinner Unplanned rather than participate in a school production. Porter's father is Scottish and still lives in Scotland.

Television career
Porter first came to widespread public attention when she attempted to slim down to a size zero by using drastic dieting regimes for the BBC documentary Super Slim Me. Porter also presented the product-testing section of How to Look Good Naked on Channel 4.

In 2008, Porter presented a BBC Three series of four documentary films, Dawn... (14 February–6 March), exploring attitudes to nudity, lesbianism, dating and pregnancy (including childbirth). Porter also appeared in Seriously Dirty Dancing, a tribute to her favourite film, Dirty Dancing, for Channel 5.

Later that year, she made a four-part series called Extreme Wife for Channel 4. In the first programme, Dawn Porter: Free Lover (30 September 2008), Porter travelled to San Diego, California, to investigate polyamory, then she travelled to former East Germany to visit ZEGG in Belzig, a German free love commune. The programme highlighted the world of free love, such as ritual sensuous oil sessions with naked people covered in warm olive oil, and included discussions with the people who lived in the commune. It premiered with 1.75m viewers (10.7% share).

In the second programme, Dawn Porter: Mail Order Bride (7 October 2008), Porter travelled to Odessa, Ukraine, with a group of American men in their search for a partner. The third programme, Dawn Porter: Geisha Girl (14 October 2008), saw Porter travel to Kyoto, Japan, and spend a week in a geisha house. In the fourth and final programme, Dawn Porter: Polygamist's Wife (21 October 2008), Porter investigated women who are prepared to share their husbands with other women. This included a stay in Centennial Park, Arizona.

In February 2009, Porter narrated the BBC Three series Undercover Princes.

In May 2009, it was announced that Porter would present a documentary, The Booby Trap, exploring breast cancer, for Sky1. The show aired on 6–7 July 2009, under the title My Breasts Could Kill Me. It premiered with 181,000 viewers (0.9% share). Porter appeared topless in the documentary to undergo a breast examination and breast screening.

Porter has her own television production company Hot Patootie TV.

On 11 November 2011, Porter made an appearance in Derren Brown – The Experiments entitled "The Secret of Luck" and later filmed six episodic advertisements for Andrex Washlets.
She appeared in E4 drama Skins and has appeared on the television show Balls of Steel.

In 2012, Porter organised an Oxfam "get together" alongside friend Gemma Cairney, and raised money for Oxfam by selling clothing previously owned by celebrities.

In 2014 Porter hosted and co-produced a series for Channel 4 called This Old Thing exploring vintage clothing. Porter hosts Soul Food on Munchies for Vice. Her production company Trilogy Films struck an overall deal with Industrial Media in April 2021.

Writing career
O'Porter writes for many publications, on feminism and aspects of women's lifestyle.

In 2006, she published Diaries of an Internet Lover. In May 2013, she released her first novel, Paper Aeroplanes, the fictional tale of an intense female friendship loosely inspired by her own childhood in Guernsey.

Her publication, The Cows, was released in 2016 and has since been featured on the Sunday Times Best Sellers list.

In October 2019, HarperCollins published her novel, So Lucky.

Charity work
O'Porter was one of the founding members of the charity Help Refugees (now called Choose Love).

Personal life
In August 2012, Porter married Chris O'Dowd and changed her name to Dawn O'Porter.

In January 2015, O'Porter gave birth to a son, Art, in Los Angeles, where they live. In 2017, O'Porter gave birth to a second son, Valentine.

References

External links
 
 

1979 births
Living people
British television presenters
British television producers
British women television producers
Guernsey women
Alumni of the Liverpool Institute for Performing Arts
British expatriates in the United States
People from Alexandria, West Dunbartonshire
Guernsey writers